An Evening with Tim Heidecker is the first stand-up comedy special from American comedian Tim Heidecker, released on October23, 2020. The special has received positive critical reception.

Recording and release

The material was filmed in Los Angeles in 2017 and had been part of bits that Heidecker workshopped for a decade. The onstage persona is based on Heidecker seeing comedians fail onstage. The special was announced with a brief trailer previewing its contents on October15.

It premiered on YouTube on October 23, 2020.

Reception
The A.V. Club Randall Colburn gave the special an A− for Heidecker's ability to lampoon stand-up specials and reproduce the kind of self-important, boisterous know-it-alls that he has portrayed throughout his career. Sean L. McCarthy of Decider wrote that the public should skip the special, as "You have to already be fully in on the Tim & Eric experience to even begin to enjoy this, as Heidecker’s schtick here will not win over any new followers. It’s an inside non-joke." Brian Logan of The Guardian gave the stand-up two out of five stars with praise for a few jokes but criticized a lack of variety.

References

External links

2020 comedy films
Stand-up comedy concert films
American comedy films
2020 films
2020s American films